The Icelandic Film School) is an Icelandic institute offering two-year Diplomas in Directing & Producing, Creative Technology, Screenwriting & Directing, and Acting. In 2002, the school moved to the former premises of Sjónvarpið on Laugavegur and its first students graduated in 2005.

References

External Links 

 

Cinema of Iceland
Education in Reykjavík
Film schools